The 1980 Democratic National Convention nominated President Jimmy Carter and Vice President Walter Mondale for reelection. The convention was held in Madison Square Garden in New York City from August 11 to August 14, 1980.

The 1980 convention was notable as it was the last time in the 20th century, for either major party, that a candidate tried to get delegates released from their voting commitments. This was done by Senator Ted Kennedy, Carter's chief rival for the nomination in the Democratic primaries, who sought the votes of delegates held by Carter.

Notable speakers
After losing his challenge for the nomination earlier that day, Ted Kennedy spoke on August 12 and delivered a speech in support of President Jimmy Carter and the Democratic Party. Kennedy's famous speech eventually closed with the lines: "For me, a few hours ago, this campaign came to an end. For all those whose cares have been our concern, the work goes on, the cause endures, the hope still lives, and the dream shall never die." His speech was written by Bob Shrum.

Various prominent delegates to this convention included Abe Beame, Geraldine Ferraro, Bruce Sundlun, Ruth Messinger, Thomas Addison, Ed Koch, Robert Abrams, Bella Abzug, Mario Biaggi, Steve Westly, and Howard Dean.

Voting
Candidates

President
Delegate voting results

Vice president
After Ted Kennedy lost the presidential nomination contest, over 700 of his delegates walked out of the convention, and the rest decided to scatter their votes. It took several roll calls to conclude the ballot.

As of 2020, this is the last time that the Democratic Party has required a roll call for the vice presidential spot.

Vice Presidential tally:

The President's acceptance speech
President Carter gave his speech accepting the party's nomination on August 14. This was notable for his gaffe intended to be a tribute to Hubert Humphrey, whom he referred to as "Hubert Horatio Hornblower".

On November 4, President Carter and Vice President Mondale lost to Ronald Reagan and George H. W. Bush in the general election, having lost both the popular election by 8,423,115 votes and the Electoral College by 440 votes.

Platform

Abortion 
In addition to its 1976 stance that merely opposed overturning Roe v. Wade, the 1980 platform for the first time explicitly supported the Roe decision as the law of the land.

See also
1980 Republican National Convention
History of the United States Democratic Party
List of Democratic National Conventions
United States presidential nominating convention
1980 Democratic Party presidential primaries
1980 United States presidential election

References

External links
 Democratic Party Platform of 1980 at The American Presidency Project
 Carter Nomination Acceptance Speech for President at DNC (transcript) at The American Presidency Project
Text and Audio of Ted Kennedy's Address
List of members from various state delegations to convention
Speech by Melvin Boozer
Video of Carter nomination acceptance speech for President at DNC (via YouTube)
Audio of Carter nomination acceptance speech for President at DNC
Video of Mondale nomination acceptance speech for Vice President at DNC (via YouTube)

Democratic National Convention
Democratic National Convention
Political conventions in New York City
New York State Democratic Committee
Political events in New York (state)
Democratic National Conventions
Democratic National Convention
1980s in Manhattan
Madison Square Garden
Democratic National Convention
Jimmy Carter
Walter Mondale